This is a complete list of women's medalists of the European Athletics Championships.

Track

100 metres

200 metres

400 metres

800 metres

1500 metres

5000 metres

10,000 metres

100 metres hurdles

400 metres hurdles

3000 metres steeplechase

4 × 100 metres relay

4 × 400 metres relay

Road

Half Marathon

Marathon

20 kilometres walk

35 kilometres walk

50 kilometres walk

Field

Long jump

Triple jump

High jump 

Note: Mariya Lasitskene (RUS) competed in 2018 as an Authorized Neutral Athlete.

Pole vault

Shot put

Discus throw

Hammer throw

Javelin throw

Heptathlon

Discontinued events

3000 metres

80 metres hurdles

10 kilometres walk

Pentathlon

References

European Championships women

Athletics European Championships